El Salvador will participate in the 2011 Parapan American Games.

Athletics

El Salvador will send three male athletes to compete.

Football 5-a-side

El Salvador will send a team of nine athletes to compete.

Goalball

El Salvador will send two teams of six athletes each to compete in the men's and women's tournaments.

Table tennis

El Salvador will send one male table tennis player to compete.

Wheelchair basketball

El Salvador will send a team of twelve male athletes and a team of ten female athletes to compete in the men's and women's tournaments.

Wheelchair tennis

El Salvador will send two male athletes to compete.

Nations at the 2011 Parapan American Games
2011 in Salvadoran sport
El Salvador at the Pan American Games